Sudley Springs is an unincorporated community in Prince William County, in the U.S. state of Virginia.

References

Unincorporated communities in Virginia
Unincorporated communities in Prince William County, Virginia
Washington metropolitan area